Constrained Application Protocol (CoAP) is a specialized Internet application protocol for constrained devices, as defined in RFC 7252. It enables those constrained devices called "nodes" to communicate with the wider Internet using similar protocols. 
CoAP is designed for use between devices on the same constrained network (e.g., low-power, lossy networks), between devices and general nodes on the Internet, and between devices on different constrained networks both joined by an internet. CoAP is also being used via other mechanisms, such as SMS on mobile communication networks.

CoAP is an application-layer protocol that is intended for use in resource-constrained Internet devices, such as wireless sensor network nodes.  CoAP is designed to easily translate to HTTP for simplified integration with the web, while also meeting specialized requirements such as multicast support, very low overhead, and simplicity. Multicast, low overhead, and simplicity are important for Internet of things (IoT) and machine-to-machine (M2M) communication, which tend to be embedded and have much less memory and power supply than traditional Internet devices have. Therefore, efficiency is very important. CoAP can run on most devices that support UDP or a UDP analogue.

The Internet Engineering Task Force (IETF) Constrained RESTful Environments Working Group (CoRE) has done the major standardization work for this protocol. In order to make the protocol suitable to IoT and M2M applications, various new functions have been added.

Specification 
Various extensions have been proposed, particularly:
  (2015) Observing Resources in the Constrained Application Protocol
  (2016) Block-Wise Transfers in the Constrained Application Protocol (CoAP)
  (2018) CoAP (Constrained Application Protocol) over TCP, TLS, and WebSockets
  (2021) Extended Tokens and Stateless Clients in the Constrained Application Protocol (CoAP)

Message formats
CoAP makes use of two message types, requests and responses, using a simple, binary header format. CoAP is by default bound to UDP and optionally to DTLS, providing a high level of communications security. When bound to UDP, the entire message must fit within a single datagram.  When used with 6LoWPAN as defined in RFC 4944, messages should fit into a single IEEE 802.15.4 frame to minimize fragmentation.

The smallest CoAP message is 4 bytes in length, if the token, options and payload fields are omitted, i.e. if it only consists of the CoAP header. The header is followed by the token value (0 to 8 bytes) which may be followed by a list of options in an optimized type–length–value format. Any bytes after the header, token and options (if any) are considered the message payload, which is prefixed by the one-byte "payload marker" (0xFF). The length of the payload is implied by the datagram length.

CoAP Fixed-Size Header 
The first 4 bytes are mandatory in all CoAP datagrams, they constitute the fixed-size header.

These fields can be extracted from these 4 bytes in C via these macros:#define COAP_HEADER_VERSION(data)  ( (0xC0 & (data)[0]) >> 6      )
#define COAP_HEADER_TYPE(data)     ( (0x30 & (data)[0]) >> 4      )
#define COAP_HEADER_TKL(data)      ( (0x0F & (data)[0]) >> 0      )
#define COAP_HEADER_CLASS(data)    ( ((data)[1] >> 5) & 0x07      )
#define COAP_HEADER_CODE(data)     ( ((data)[1] >> 0) & 0x1F      )
#define COAP_HEADER_MID(data)      ( ((data)[2] << 8) | (data)[3] )

Version (ver) (2 bits) 

Indicates the CoAP version number.

Type (2 bits) 

This describes the datagram's message type for the two message type context of Request and Response.
 Request
 0 : Confirmable : This message expects a corresponding acknowledgement message.
 1 : Non-confirmable : This message does not expect a confirmation message.
 Response
 2 : Acknowledgement : This message is a response that acknowledge a confirmable message
 3 : Reset : This message indicates that it had received a message but could not process it.

Token length (4 bits) 

Indicates the length of the variable-length Token field, which may be 0–8 bytes in length.

Request/response code (8 bits) 

The three most significant bits form a number known as the "class", which is analogous to the class of HTTP status codes. The five least significant bits form a code that communicates further detail about the request or response. The entire code is typically communicated in the form class.code .

 Method: 0.XX 
 Success: 2.XX 
 Client Error: 4.XX 
 Server error: 5.XX 
 Signaling Codes: 7.XX

Message ID (16 bits) 

Used to detect message duplication and to match messages of type acknowledgement/reset to messages of type confirmable/non-confirmable.

Token 
Every request carries a token (but it may be zero length) whose value was generated by the client. The server must echo every token value without any modification back to the client in the corresponding response. It is intended for use as a client-local identifier to match requests and responses, especially for concurrent requests.

Matching requests and responses is not done with the message ID because a response may be sent in a different message than the acknowledgement (which uses the message ID for matching). For example, this could be done to prevent retransmissions if obtaining the result takes some time. Such a detached response is called "separate response". In contrast, transmitting the response directly in the acknowledgement is called "piggybacked response" which is expected to be preferred for efficiency reasons.

Option 

Option delta:

 0 to 12: For delta between 0 to 12: Represents the exact delta value between the last option ID and the desired option ID, with no option delta extended value
 13: For delta from 13 to 268: Option delta extended is an 8-bit value that represents the option delta value minus 13
 14: For delta from 269 to 65,804: Option delta extended is a 16-bit value that represents the option delta value minus 269
 15: Reserved for payload marker, where the option delta and option length are set together as 0xFF.

Option length:

 0 to 12: For option length between 0 to 12: Represents the exact length value, with no option length extended value
 13: For option length from 13 to 268: Option length extended is an 8-bit value that represents the option length value minus 13
 14: For option length from 269 to 65,804: Option length extended is a 16-bit value that represents the option length value minus 269
 15: Reserved for future use. It is an error for the option length field to be set to 0xFF. 

Option value:

 Size of option value field is defined by option length value in bytes.
 Semantic and format this field depends on the respective option.

Implementations

Proxy implementations
 Squid 3.1.9 with transparent HTTP-CoAP mapping module
 jcoap Proxy
 Californium cf-proxy2
 CoAPthon
 FreeCoAP

CoAP group communication
In many CoAP application domains it is essential to have the ability to address several CoAP resources as a group, instead of addressing each resource individually 
(e.g. to turn on all the CoAP-enabled lights in a room with a single CoAP request triggered by toggling the light switch).
To address this need, the IETF has developed an optional extension for CoAP in the form of an experimental RFC: Group Communication for CoAP - RFC 7390  
This extension relies on IP multicast to deliver the CoAP request to all group members. 
The use of multicast has certain benefits such as reducing the number of packets needed to deliver the request to the members. 
However, multicast also has its limitations such as poor reliability and being cache-unfriendly. 
An alternative method for CoAP group communication that uses unicasts instead of multicasts relies on having an intermediary where the groups are created.
Clients send their group requests to the intermediary, which in turn sends individual unicast requests to the group members, collects the replies from them, and sends back an aggregated reply to the client.

Security 
CoAP defines four security modes 
 NoSec, where DTLS is disabled
 PreSharedKey, where DTLS is enabled, there is a list of pre-shared keys, and each key includes a list of which nodes it can be used to communicate with.  Devices must support the AES cipher suite.
 RawPublicKey, where DTLS is enabled and the device uses an asymmetric key pair without a certificate, which is validated out of band. Devices must support the AES cipher suite and Elliptic Curve algorithms for key exchange.
 Certificate, where DTLS is enabled and the device uses X.509 certificates for validation.

Research has been conducted on optimizing DTLS by implementing security associates as CoAP resources rather than using DTLS as a security wrapper for CoAP traffic.  This research has indicated that improvements of up to 6.5 times none optimized implementations. 

In addition to DTLS, RFC8613 defines the Object Security for Constrained RESTful Environments (OSCORE) protocol which provides security for CoAP at the application layer.

Security issues 
Although the protocol standard includes provisions for mitigating the threat of DDoS amplification attacks, these provisions are not implemented in practice, resulting in the presence of over 580,000 targets primarily located in China and attacks up to 320 Gbit/s.

See also
 Internet of Things
 OMA Lightweight M2M
 Web of Things
 Static Context Header Compression (SCHC)

References

External links 

 RFC 7252 "The Constrained Application Protocol (CoAP)"
 coap.me – CoAP test server run by University of Bremen

Hypertext Transfer Protocol
Application layer protocols
Internet of things